Tyranninyssus is a genus of mites in the family Rhinonyssidae. There are at least four described species in Tyranninyssus.

Species
These four species belong to the genus Tyranninyssus:
 Tyranninyssus attilae Fain & Aitken, 1970
 Tyranninyssus myiarchi Cruz, 1971
 Tyranninyssus myiophobi Fain & Aitken, 1967
 Tyranninyssus tyrannus Brooks & Strandtmann, 1960

References

Rhinonyssidae
Articles created by Qbugbot